Charles "Buddy" Fornes (March 23, 1931 – January 25, 1983) was an American football player and coach. He served as the head football coach at his alma mater, McMurry University in Abilene, Texas, from 1966 to 1972 and Tarleton State University in Stephenville, Texas from 1973 to 1982, compiling a career college football coaching record of 66–101–2.

Fornes was found by his wife dead from a shotgun wound to his chest, on January 25, 1983, at his home in Stephenville, Texas.   His death was ruled a suicide.

Head coaching record

References

External links
 

1931 births
1983 deaths
McMurry War Hawks football coaches
McMurry War Hawks football players
Tarleton State Texans athletic directors
Tarleton State Texans football coaches
High school football coaches in Texas
Suicides by firearm in Texas
1983 suicides